The 1992 Ukrainian Cup Final is a football match that took place at the Republican Stadium on May 31, 1992. The match was the 1st Ukrainian Cup Final and it was contested by FC Chornomorets Odessa and FC Metalist Kharkiv. The 1992 Ukrainian Cup Final was the first to be held in the Ukrainian capital Kyiv. Chornomorets won the match 1:0 on the silver goal rule when the Illya Tsymbalar's 107' goal gave the Odessa club the win during the extra time.

The match also had 1 yellow card issued to Kastorny (Metalist).

Road to Kyiv 

Six Ukrainian Premier League clubs that competed last year in the Soviet Supreme League started from the second round (1/8) of which included both Chornomorets and Metalist.

The two teams had some difficulties along the way. Chornomorets surprisingly lost its first game in Zhytomyr to Polissya 1:4 (!), but reinstated themselves in the return leg with a colossal 7:1 win. Then had to visit Zaporizhia two rounds in a row before qualifying for this final. Metalist came to the final after defeating Shakhtar in the semi-finals and were considered able to repeat their previous Soviet achievement by earning another national trophy.

Match details

Match statistics

See also
 Ukrainian Cup 1992

References

External links 
 Calendar of Matches - Schedule of the 1992 Ukrainian Cup on the Ukrainian Soccer History web-site (ukrsoccerhistory.com). 
 Quarter of century of the National Bowl (video) (Чверть століття національній Чаші). Ukrainian Premier League. 31 May 2017

Cup Final
Ukrainian Cup finals
Ukrainian Cup Final 1992
Ukrainian Cup Final 1992
Ukrainian Cup Final 1992